Kimberly W. Anderson is an American chemist. She is the Gill Eminent Professor of Chemical Engineering and Associate Dean for Administration and Academic Affairs in the College of Engineering at the University of Kentucky.

Education and career 
Anderson studied chemical engineering at Youngstown State University and received her PhD in chemical engineering and bioengineering from Carnegie Mellon University. She joined the University of Kentucky in 1987 as an assistant professor in the Department of Chemical Engineering and faculty associate in the Center of Membrane Sciences. She was the department's director of graduate studies (1993–1996) and later served in the Department of Biomedical Engineering. She was associate dean for administration and academic affairs in the College of Engineering from 1996–1999.

Awards and honors 
 2015 – Inducted in the American Institute for Medical and Biological Engineering
 1991 – Excellence Award in Undergraduate Education, University of Kentucky

Selected publications

References 

Year of birth missing (living people)
Living people
21st-century American chemists
Youngstown State University alumni
Carnegie Mellon University College of Engineering alumni
University of Kentucky faculty